The Daniels County Courthouse, located at 213 Main Street in Scobey, is the county courthouse serving Daniels County, Montana. The building was erected in 1913, the same year Scobey was relocated to a site on the Great Northern Railway, and originally functioned as a hotel. The two-story building, which had a false front, was the largest in the city at the time. Over the next seven years, the hotel passed through several hands; it became known as "One-eyed Molly's House of Pleasure" after its most notorious proprietor, a glass-eyed woman known as One-Eyed Molly who supposedly ran a brothel from the hotel. When Daniels County was established in 1920, the newly formed county purchased the hotel to use as its courthouse.

The courthouse was added to the National Register of Historic Places on May 4, 1995.

References

County courthouses in Montana
Courthouses on the National Register of Historic Places in Montana
Hotels in Montana
Hotels established in 1913
1913 establishments in Montana
Hotel buildings completed in 1913
National Register of Historic Places in Daniels County, Montana
Western false front architecture
Brothels in the United States